Brian A. Skiff is an American astronomer noted for discovering numerous asteroids and a number of comets including the periodic comets 114P/Wiseman–Skiff (with Jennifer Wiseman) and 140P/Bowell–Skiff (with Edward Bowell).

Biography 
Skiff received his BS from Northern Arizona University in 1977 and has worked as an astronomer at Lowell Observatory since 1976.

Between 1980 and 1997, he has also discovered a total 60 numbered minor planets, including , a dark Jupiter trojan about 37 kilometers in diameter. Working on the LONEOS project he rediscovered the long lost asteroid 69230 Hermes in October 2003 and the Apohele asteroid  in May 2004.  

He is also a volleyball player with the Mars Hill summer volleyball squad.

Awards and honors 

The Florian main-belt asteroid 2554 Skiff was named in his honour. The official naming citation was published by the Minor Planet Center on 8 April 1982.

Skiff received the Texas Star Party’s Lone Star Gazer Award in 1986.

List of discovered minor planets 

Brian Skiff is credited with the discovery and co-discovery of 60 minor planets between 1981 and 1997. The co-discovery of 2557 Putnam, 3256 Daguerre, 3807 Pagels and 4193 Salanave he made in collaboration with Norman G. Thomas .

See also

Works 

Skiff has published 122 refereed papers on astronomy. His most cited paper is:

He is also the author of two books:

References 
 

American astronomers
Discoverers of asteroids

Living people
Year of birth missing (living people)